The Lokmanya Tilak Terminus–Hatia Superfast Express is a Superfast train belonging to South Eastern Railway zone that runs between  and  in India. It is currently being operated with 12811/12812 train numbers on bi-weekly basis.

Service

 12811/Mumbai LTT–Hatia Superfast Express has an average speed of 62 km/hr and covers 1,699 km in 27h 30m. 
 12812/Hatia–Mumbai LTT Superfast Express has an average speed of 61 km/hr and covers 1,699 km in 27h 55m.

Route and halts 

The important halts of the train are:

Coach composition

The train has LHB coach with max speed of 160 kmph. The train consists of 23 coaches:

 1 AC II Tier
 3 AC III Tier
 13 Sleeper coaches
 1 Pantry car
 3 General Unreserved
 2 Seating cum Luggage Rake

Traction

Both trains are hauled by a Santragachi Loco Shed-based WAP-4 electric locomotive from Kurla to Hatia and vice versa.

Rake sharing

The train shares its rake with 12817/12818 Jharkhand Swarna Jayanti Express, 12873/12874 Jharkhand Swarna Jayanti Express (via Barkakana) and 12835/12836 Hatia–Yesvantpur Superfast Express.

See also 

 Lokmanya Tilak Terminus railway station
 Hatia railway station
 Jharkhand Swarna Jayanti Express
 Jharkhand Swarna Jayanti Express (via Barkakana)
 Hatia–Yesvantpur Superfast Express

Notes

References

External links 

 12811/Mumbai LTT–atia SF Express India Rail Info
 12812/Hatia–umbai LTT SF Express India Rail Info

Transport in Ranchi
Transport in Mumbai
Express trains in India
Rail transport in Maharashtra
Rail transport in Chhattisgarh
Rail transport in Odisha
Rail transport in Jharkhand
Railway services introduced in 2003